"Happy Days" is Ai Otsuka's fourth single. The title track was used as background music in the Morinaga ICE BOX CM, which starred Otsuka, and as the theme of Koukousei Quiz 2004 on Nihon TV. It also contained a new b-side song  and instrumental versions of both songs.  Number three Oricon charts.

Track list

Sales
Total estimate: 163,433

References
avex online (2006), Ai Otsuka Official Web Site
Oricon Style (2006), Oricon Style Online

Ai Otsuka songs
2004 singles
Songs written by Ai Otsuka
2004 songs
Avex Trax singles